Aspa marginata is a species of sea snail, a marine gastropod mollusk in the family Bursidae, the frog shells.

Description

These shells are quite thick, beige in color, with a smooth surface, a deep siphonal canal  and a short spire.

Distribution

This marine species occurs in Western Africa, Senegal and Canary Islands.

Fossil records

This genus is known in the fossil records from the Miocene of Italy and France to the Quaternary of Namibia and Spain (age range: from 15.97 to 0.781 million years ago).

Cultural aspects

The fossilized shells have been valued by humans and Neanderthals.

Bibliography
 Bernard, P.A. (Ed.) (1984). Coquillages du Gabon [Shells of Gabon]. Pierre A. Bernard: Libreville, Gabon. 140, 75 plates
 Gofas, S.; Afonso, J.P.; Brandào, M. (Ed.). (S.a.). Conchas e Moluscos de Angola = Coquillages et Mollusques d'Angola. [Shells and molluscs of Angola]. Universidade Agostinho / Elf Aquitaine Angola: Angola. 140 pp. 
 Gofas, S.; Le Renard, J.; Bouchet, P. (2001). Mollusca, in: Costello, M.J. et al. (Ed.) (2001). European register of marine species: a check-list of the marine species in Europe and a bibliography of guides to their identification. Collection Patrimoines Naturels, 50: pp. 180–213
 Rolán E., 2005. Malacological Fauna From The Cape Verde Archipelago. Part 1, Polyplacophora and Gastropoda.

References

External links
 Conchology
 Shell Canary Islands

Bursidae
Gastropods described in 1791
Taxa named by Johann Friedrich Gmelin